Line 12 (Sapphire) (formerly Line F (Purple), is one of the seven lines operated by CPTM and one of the thirteen lines that make up the Sao Paulo Metro Rail Transport Network, in Brazil.

Stations

Notes

References

External links

 Official page of the CPTM
 Secretaria dos Transportes Metropolitanos

Companhia Paulista de Trens Metropolitanos
CPTM 12